Anastasia "Nastiya" Gorbenko (born ) is an Israeli competitive swimmer. She competes in the 100 m backstroke, 100 m breaststroke, 100 m freestyle, 200 m backstroke, 200 m breaststroke, 200 m medley, 50 m backstroke, 4x100 m freestyle, 4x100 m medley, 4x100m freestyle mixed, and 4x200m freestyle. Having won 4 World and European championships gold medals, competing at 2 Olympic finals, breaking most of the Israeli national records for women and mixed relays – Gorbenko is considered to be Israel's greatest swimmer of all time.

Gorbenko won the gold medal in the girls' 200 m individual medley at the 2018 Youth Olympic Games. In 2019, at the Barcelona Open she won the women's 200 m individual medley, and later in the year she established new Israeli national records in the 200 m individual medley and 200 m breaststroke. As of November 2019, she set new Israeli national records in the 50 back, 100 back, 200 breast, 200 IM, and 400 IM in long course, and the 200 IM in short course, and shared four national relay records. She competed for Israel at the 2020 Summer Olympics in two Olympic finals: one in the women's 100m individual backstroke event, and one in the mixed 4 × 100 metre medley relay event together with her fellow Israeli mixed teammates. In May 2021, Gorbenko won the gold medal in the 200 m medley at the 2020 European Championships (LC) in Budapest. In November 2021, Gorbenko won the gold medal in the 200 m medley at the 2020 European Championships (SC) in Kazan. In December 2021, at the 2021 World Championships (SC) in Abu Dhabi, Gorbenko won 2 individual gold medals: The first gold medal in the 50 m breaststroke, and the second gold medal in the 100 m medley; Thus, setting and breaking her own national records for Israel – at the same event.

Early life
Gorbenko was born in Haifa, Israel. She grew up in Kiryat Yam, Israel. Both her father Vladimir Gorbenko and her mother Larisa immigrated from Ukraine to Israel. She has an older sister and a younger sister. Since 2018, she attends the Wingate Institute in Netanya, Israel, in order to train for swimming, which takes her to study during weekdays at the Hof HaSharon High School in kibbutz Shefayim, Israel, majoring in biology.

Career
She competes in the 100 m backstroke, 100 m breaststroke, 100 m freestyle, 200 m backstroke, 200 m breaststroke, 200 m medley, 50 m backstroke, 4x100 m freestyle, 4x100 m medley, 4x100m freestyle mixed, and 4x200m freestyle.  Gorbenko “slightly” prefers breaststroke. Gorbenko's club is Maccabi Kiryat Bialik.

2016–2017; Maccabiah Games gold medals
In April 2016 Gorbenko set an Israeli age 13 record in the 100 m breaststroke, at 1:15.43.

In April 2017 she set an Israeli age 14 record in the 100 m backstroke, at 1:04.21, and in the 200 m individual medley, at 2:19.15, and in June 2017 Gorbenko set an Israeli age 14 record in the 200 m breaststroke, at 2:35.94. In July 2017 at the 2017 Maccabiah Games, Gorbenko won gold medals in the girl's 100 m junior freestyle, as well as the girls' 4x100 m freestyle relay.

2018; Youth Olympics gold medal
In July 2018 Gorbenko set a new Israeli record in the 200 m breaststroke, at 2:29.17, at the 2018 European Junior Swimming Championships; Long Course (50 m) in Helsinki, Finland. In August 2018 she set a new Israeli record in the 100 m breaststroke, at 1:09.44, at the 2018 European Aquatics Championships; Long Course (50 m) in Glasgow, Scotland.

In October 2018, having just turned 15 years of age and competing against girls two to three years older, she won the girls' 200 m individual medley at the 2018 Youth Olympic Games in Buenos Aires, Argentina. It was Israel's first gold medal in swimming at this level of international competition. Gorbenko swam a 2:12.88 – with splits of 29.31 (after butterfly), 1:03.43 (after backstroke), and 1:41.49 (after breaststroke), beating Anja Crevar of Serbia by more than a second.  She set a new Israeli record, breaking that achieved by Amit Ivry in the 2012 London Olympics (2:13.29).

2019; Barcelona Open gold medal
In January 2019, at the age of 15, at the Barcelona Open in the women's 200 m individual medley Gorbenko swam a 2:13.56 to win by over 4 seconds. She swam the fastest fly, back, and breaststroke splits in the field, at 28.60, 34.60, and 38.36 respectively.

In March 2019 at the French Golden Tour meet she set three new Israeli records; in the 100 m backstroke (1:01.03), in the 200 m IM (2:12.54), and in the 400 m IM (4:47.58).

In May 2019, at the 2019 Speedo Grand Challenge in Irvine, California, Gorbenko established a new Israeli national record in the 200 m individual medley with a time of 2:11.98, and established a new Israeli national record in the 200 m breaststroke with a time of 2:28.78 (breaking the prior record of 2:29.03 set by Julia Banach in 2009) to win the event by over a second. Gorbenko also placed second in the 100 m breaststroke with a time of 1:10.04, just short of her personal best of 1:09.74. In addition she swam a personal best in the 200 m freestyle (2:00.83).

In July 2019, at the 2019 European Junior Swimming Championships in Kazan, Russia, she won silver medals in both the women's 50 m backstroke (setting a new Israeli national record with a time of 28.21), behind Daria Vaskina of Russia, and in the women's 200 m individual medley behind Zoe Vogelmann of Germany.

Gorbenko competed in the women's 200 m individual medley at the 2019 World Aquatics Championships.

In August 2019 at the 7th FINA World Junior Swimming Championships she set a new national record in the women's 100 m backstroke with a time of 1:00.58.

In October 2019 Gorbenko set an Israeli record in the women's 400 m individual medley with a time of 4:37.68. That month she also  set a national record when she swam a 2:07.64 in the 200 m individual medley for LA Current in Budapest, Hungary. In doing so she also set a new European junior short course 200 m individual medley record. She also led off the 400 m freestyle relay to an Israeli record in the 100 m free, swimming a 52.87.

In November 2019, she broke her own Israeli record in the women's 400 individual medley at the Kiryat Bialik pool as part of the Millennium meet, swimming a 4:35.82. Gorbenko also set a new Israeli junior record in the 50 m breaststroke with a 31.01. As of that month, she set new Israeli national records in the 50 back, 100 back, 200 breast, 200 IM, and 400 IM in long course, and the 200 IM in short course, and shared four national relay records.

2021; Tokyo Summer Olympics (2020)

Gorbenko represented Israel at the 2020 Summer Olympics in five different events: She finished 10th in the women's 200 m individual medley event's semifinals. She also competed in the women's 100m backstroke event, where she qualified for the final in the competition, finishing 8th overall. Gorbenko competed in the second heat and in the final of the mixed 4 × 100 metre medley relay (59.55) of the Summer Olympics, along with fellow Israeli Olympic swimmers: Itay Goldfaden (59.86), Gal Cohen Groumi (51.58), and Andrea Murez (53.78), finishing 8th overall in the mixed event's final.

2021; World Championships, European Championships, and World Cup gold medals

In May 2021,  at the age of 17, Gorbenko won the gold medal in the 200 individual medley at the 2020 European Championships (LC) in Budapest.

In October 2021 Gorbenko won the gold medal in the 50 m breakstroke, and the gold medal in the 100 m breakstroke, as well as gold medal in the 100 m individual medley at the 2021 Swimming World Cup (SC) in Berlin.

In November 2021, Gorbenko won the gold medal in the 200 m individual medley at the 2020 European Championships (SC) in Kazan.

In December 2021, at the 2021 World Championships (SC) in Abu Dhabi, Gorbenko won two individual gold medals: The first gold medal in the 50 m breaststroke, and the second gold medal in the 100 m individual medley; Thus, setting and breaking her own national records for Israel – at the same event.

Accomplishments and awards
 8th place: 100 m backstroke at the 2020 Summer Olympics (LC) in Tokyo
 8th place: Mixed 4 × 100 m medley relay at the 2020 Summer Olympics (LC) in Tokyo
 1st place: 50 m breaststroke at the 2021 Swimming World Cup (SC) in Berlin
 1st place: 100 m breaststroke at the 2021 Swimming World Cup (SC) in Berlin
 1st place: 100 m individual medley at the 2021 Swimming World Cup (SC) in Berlin
 1st place: 200 m medley at the 2020 European Swimming Championships (LC) in Budapest
 1st place: 200 m individual medley at the 2021 European Swimming Championships (SC) in Kazan
 1st place: 50 m breaststroke at the 2021 FINA World Swimming World Cup (SC) in Abu Dhabi
 1st place: 100 m individual medley at the 2021 FINA World Swimming World Cup (SC) in Abu Dhabi
 5th place: 200 m individual medley at the 2022 FINA World Swimming World Cup (LC) in Budapest
 FINA's Top 10 Moments: 2021 FINA Swimming World Cup (#2)
 Forbes 30 Under 30 of 2022 by Forbes Israel

See also
List of Israeli records in swimming
Israel at the Youth Olympics
List of Israelis

References

External links
 
 
 
 
 
 
 

 

2003 births
Living people
Israeli female swimmers
Place of birth missing (living people)
Swimmers at the 2018 Summer Youth Olympics
Swimmers at the 2020 Summer Olympics
Youth Olympic gold medalists for Israel
Competitors at the 2017 Maccabiah Games
Competitors at the 2022 Maccabiah Games
Maccabiah Games medalists in swimming
Maccabiah Games gold medalists for Israel
Sportspeople from Kiryat Bialik
Wingate Institute alumni
Female backstroke swimmers
Female breaststroke swimmers
Israeli female freestyle swimmers
Israeli people of Ukrainian descent
Israeli people of Soviet descent
European Aquatics Championships medalists in swimming